Macromphalina canarreos is a species of very small sea snail, a marine gastropod mollusk in the family Vanikoridae.

Distribution

Description 
The maximum recorded shell length is 1.82 mm.

Habitat 
The minimum recorded depth for this species is 20 m; the maximum recorded depth is 20 m.

References

Vanikoridae
Gastropods described in 1998